"Hymn" is a song recorded by American singer Kesha, from her third studio album, Rainbow. It was released as a promotional single on August 3, 2017. "Hymn" contains references to those who feel like they do not belong, such as those with no religion. The song was originally titled "Hymn for the Hymnless".

Music video
The music video for the song was released on May 31, 2018. Upon releasing the video, Kesha stated that although she had been holding onto the video for a while, meeting Cristina Jiménez of United We Dream had inspired her to release it and dedicate the song to the organization's Deferred Action for Childhood Arrivals (DACA) program.

In the video, Kesha is seen riding in the backseat of a self-driven car on a seemingly deserted highway. She sings the lyrics to "Hymn" and looks up at the sky, showing that it is dusk. The car comes to a stop in front of a group of people, who were previously shown individually, that are staring upward at an approaching spaceship. After Kesha gets out of the car to join them, the UFO abducts her car and tries to abduct the crowd beneath it, to no avail. Finally, the spaceship blasts off and a nonchalant Kesha walks down the highway, now carless.

Charts

References

2017 singles
2017 songs
Kemosabe Records singles
Kesha songs
RCA Records singles
Songs written by Pebe Sebert
Songs written by Kesha
Songs written by Ricky Reed